Ebernburg Castle is a castle above the town of Bad Münster am Stein-Ebernburg in Rhineland-Palatinate, Germany.

References

External links
 

Buildings and structures completed in 1338
Buildings and structures in Bad Kreuznach (district)
Ebernburg
House of Sickingen
Naheland
North Palatinate